Mongkol (meaning 'auspicious'; from Pali/Sanskrit ) is a Thai masculine given name. Notable people with the name include:

Mongkol Aimmanolrom, Thai basketball player
Mongkol Na Songkhla (1941–2020), Thai politician
Mongkol Namnuad (born 1985), Thai football player
Mongkol Tossakrai (born 1987), Thai football player
Mongkhon Wiwasuk, Muay Thai boxer known professionally as Malaipet Sasiprapa

See also
Mongkhon

Thai masculine given names